Stygobromus mackenziei, commonly called Mackenzie's cave amphipod, is a troglomorphic species of amphipod in family Crangonyctidae. It is endemic to California, where it occurs only in Empire Cave. This cave is part of the Porter Caves, in the grounds of University of California, Santa Cruz.

References

Freshwater crustaceans of North America
Cave crustaceans
Crustaceans described in 1974
mackenziei
Endemic fauna of California